Ellen "Nelly" Maud Cheeseman (6 September 18481928) was a painter and botanist from England who emigrated to New Zealand as a child. Her watercolour paintings of New Zealand birds, animals and landscapes are in the permanent collection of Auckland War Memorial Museum.

Biography 
Cheeseman was born in England in 1848 and emigrated to New Zealand with her family, arriving in Auckland on 4 April 1854 on the Artemesia. Her father was Thomas Cheeseman, a Methodist minister who moved the family to New Zealand in the hope that the climate would cure a throat ailment he suffered from. She had four siblings: two brothers, William and Thomas, and two sisters, Emma and Clara.

Cheeseman worked with her brother Thomas, the curator of Auckland Museum, on projects to document New Zealand's flora and wildlife. She produced detailed, coloured paintings of butterflies, lizards, insects, shells and birds. In 1899 she and Thomas went on a government-funded trip to the Cook Islands to record the flora of the islands.

Cheeseman was a member of the New Zealand Naturalist Society and went on field trips with the group, painting the landscapes of their destinations, such as Thames River and the Coromandel Peninsula. Her art was also published in the Naturalist Society journal.

Cheeseman's botanical art is also held in the New Zealand National Herbarium Network library in Auckland.

References

1848 births
1928 deaths
English emigrants to New Zealand
19th-century New Zealand botanists
19th-century New Zealand painters
People associated with the Auckland War Memorial Museum
20th-century New Zealand botanists